The 1950 Giro d'Italia was the 33rd edition of the Giro d'Italia, one of cycling's Grand Tours. The Giro started in Milan on 24 May with a  individual time trial and concluded in Salsomaggiore Terme with a  relatively flat mass-start stage on 13 June. Fifteen teams entered the race, which was won by Swiss Hugo Koblet of the Guerra team. Second and third respectively were Italians Gino Bartali and Alfredo Martini.

Teams

It was announced in January 1950 that there would not be more than 100 riders starting the race. However, fifteen teams of seven were granted entry for the race. This meant the starting peloton consisted of 105 cyclists, the same amount that started the 1949 edition. Italians comprised the majority of the entrants (88), while the remaining 17 foreign riders were from France (9), Switzerland (5), Belgium (2), and Luxembourg (1). Of the starting riders, 75 completed the course.

The teams entering the race were:

Pre-race favorites

The race featured three previous winners of the Giro d'Italia that later became known as the "Big Three" or "Italian Tripod": Gino Bartali, Fausto Coppi, and Fiorenzo Magni. That season the three of them had success in the classics as Bartali won Milan–San Remo, Coppi won Paris–Roubaix and La Flèche Wallonne, and Magni won his second Tour of Flanders. Despite this, many writers and fellow riders like Magni, Jean Robic, and Giulio Bresci still viewed it as a competition between Coppi and Bartali, with Coppi was regarded as the favorite entering the race. When asked who was his toughest opponent in the race, Coppi answered Bartali and Robic.

A Nouvelliste valaisan writer commented that this was the first Giro to feature foreigners as team captains. 1947 Tour de France winner Robic, Fritz Schär, and Ferdinand Kübler entered as sole leaders of their respective squads. 's leader upon entry was Belgian Marcel Dupont, while teammate Hugo Koblet's recent form made some believe he may end up leading the team during the race. El Mundo Deportivo'''s Luis Bettonica felt that for either Bartali or Coppi to not win they will have to face a large amount of difficulties. Vito Ortelli was not viewed as a serious challenger following a poor performance at the Tour de Romandie and due to his general inconsistent finishes. Ortelli when asked about his intentions at the Giro, replied "I will be running it." Kübler was seen as a threat to challenge Bartali and Coppi because his team was strong and had openly stated he would be in good form when the race hits Locarno. The French team featured Apo Lazaridès and Lucien Teisseire, who placed second and third at the 1948 world championships, respectively.  brought sprinter Adolfo Leoni who won several stages and wore the race leader's pink jersey late into the last year's race before Coppi took the race lead with two stages left and young rider Pasquale Fornara. 's Luciano Maggini was seen as a contender for the sprint finishes, while Alfredo Martini and Giancarlo Astrua were expected to achieve high final rankings in the general classification. l'Unità writer Attilio Camoriano expected Martini to be the "big surprise of the race."

Route and stages

Before being released, it was rumored the race would go from 24 May to 11 June. The route was revealed on 26 January 1950. The ninth stage in particular featured the three major climbs of Passo Rolle, Passo Pordoi, Gardena Pass. In total the route was thought to be very flat as it contained  of climbing.

This change was precipitated because 1950 was declared a Jubilee by Pope Pius XII. Due to the route changes, this meant the Dolomites would be visited during the middle of the race, while the Apennines would be traversed near the race's conclusion. Following the Milan opening in the Piazza del Duomo square, the race route veered west passing through Florence and Genoa on its way into the Dolomites and passing through finishing in Locarno, a Swiss town. Then the route turned south and traveled down along the Adriatic coast and traversed the Apennines before returning north to finish in Rome.

Classification leadership

The leader of the general classification – calculated by adding the stage finish times of each rider, and subtracting time bonuses – wore a pink jersey. This classification is the most important of the race, and its winner is considered as the winner of the Giro.

Two additional jerseys were awarded. The green jersey was given to the highest ranked non-Italian cyclist in the general classification, and the white jersey was given to the highest ranked independent cyclist in the general classification. Another green jersey was awarded to the best placed foreign rider in the general classification.

There were also some classifications without associated jerseys. There was the mountains classification, for which the race organizers selected different mountains that the route crossed and awarded points to the riders who crossed them first.

There was a black jersey (maglia nera) awarded to the rider placed last in the general classification. The classification was calculated in the same manner as the general classification.

Secondly, there was an intermediate sprints classification. In twelve stages, there were intermediate sprints midway of the stage, where points for this classification could be won.

The winner of the team classification was determined by adding the finish times of the best three cyclists per team together and the team with the lowest total time was the winner. If a team had fewer than three riders finish, they were not eligible for the classification.

There several time bonuses awarded to riders for various accomplishments during the race.

The rows in the following table correspond to the jerseys awarded after that stage was run. A one-minute bonus was given to the winner of each stage, the intermediate sprint in the twelve stages containing a sprint, and the winner of a mountain classification climb. Second place in those same categories awarded a 30 s time bonus.

Final standings

General classification

Foreign rider classification

Independent rider classification

Mountains classification

Intermediate sprints classification

Team classification

Minor awards

Two blue bracelets were awarded for winning a stage with the greatest time gap between the second placed rider. Koblet won the first bracelet for winning the sixth stage into Locarno by 1' 48s, while the second bracelet was given to Astrua for his victory on the fifteenth leg that finished in L'Aquila. He won that stage by five minutes and six seconds. A classification was kept regarding the amount of stage victories per rider. The classification was split by four riders who each won two stages: Conte (stages 1 and 18), Bevilacqua (stages 4 and 12), Koblet (stages, and 8), and Luciano Maggini (stages 7 and 13).

Aftermath

Following the race, the entire peloton that finished the race traveled to St. Peter's Basilica to hear a Wednesday service by Pope Pius XII on 14 June. In particular, Koblet and Bartali spoke with the Pope personally and the Pope asked of Coppi's health. Previous winner Fausto Coppi, who was recovering in a Trento hospital, commented "Koblet deserved to win the Tour of Italy and he is worthy of all praise." Following the race, Guerra announced Koblet renewed his contract with the team. A Swiss newspaper writer Nouvelliste Valaisan'' wrote that the Swiss riders dominated the race, holding the race lead for all but two days, and all five Swiss riders that started, finished the race. The writer commented that Koblet was not seen as the initial leader for Guerra, as Marcel Dupont entered as their leader. The writer also felt that Koblet's victory earned Swiss cycling respect within the cycling community and may lead to an invitation for a ten-man team to a future Tour de France – which at the time was contested by national teams rather than trade teams. Ferdinand Kübler was viewed to have a great race relative when compared to his last Grand Tour, the 1949 Tour de France. Based on his high finish Kübler was expected to seriously contend at the upcoming Tour de France. Had the race been run without time bonuses factored into the general classification, Bartali would have won the race by 18 seconds over Koblet.

References

Citations

 
1950
Giro d'Italia
Giro d'Italia
Giro d'Italia
Giro d'Italia
Giro d'Italia